"I Saw Mommy Kissing Santa Claus" is a Christmas song with music and lyrics by British songwriter Tommie Connor and first recorded by American singer Jimmy Boyd in 1952. The song has since been covered by many artists, with the Ronettes's 1963 and the Jackson 5's 1970 versions being the most famous.

Jimmy Boyd original version
The original recording by Jimmy Boyd, recorded on 15 July 1952, when he was 13 years old, reached No. 1 on the Billboard pop singles chart in December 1952, and on the Cash Box chart at the beginning of the following year. It later reached number three in the UK Singles Chart when released there in November 1953. The song was commissioned by Saks Fifth Avenue to promote the store's Christmas card for the year, which featured an original sketch by artist Perry Barlow, who drew for The New Yorker for many decades.

The song describes a scene where a child walks downstairs from his bedroom on Christmas Eve to see his mom kissing "Santa Claus" under the mistletoe. The lyric concludes with the child wondering how his father will react on hearing of the kiss, unaware of the possibility that Santa Claus is merely his father in a costume.

Boyd's record was condemned by the Roman Catholic Church in Boston when it was released, believing that it described an adulterous encounter. Boyd was photographed meeting with the Archdiocese to explain the song. After the meeting, the ban was lifted.

Cover versions 
A less successful version of the song was released in 1952 by Spike Jones (with vocal by George Rock in the little boy voice used in Spike's hit "All I Want For Christmas Is My Two Front Teeth").  Jones also recorded a parody for his personal pleasure titled "I Saw Mommy Screwing Santa Claus."

Versions by the Beverley Sisters and by Billy Cotton and His Band charted on the UK Singles Chart in December 1953, peaking at, respectively, number six and number eleven.

The Ronettes recorded their own version in 1963 for A Christmas Gift for You from Phil Spector. The version peaked at number eighty-four on Billboard Holiday 100 on the week ending 9 December 2016.

The Jackson 5 recorded the song for their 1970 Christmas album. The version entered the UK Singles Chart on its peak position, number ninety-one, on the week ending 5 December 1987, and charted there for four weeks total. It also peaked at number forty-five on Billboard Holiday 100 on the week ending 6 January 2012, and number one hundred in a Swiss singles chart on the week ending 29 December 2019.

In 1987, a recording by John Cougar Mellencamp featured on the first A Very Special Christmas compilation album, which benefits the Special Olympics.

Film adaptation 
A made-for-television movie based on the song was released in 2001.

Certifications

References

External links 
 Lyrics to I Saw Mommy Kissing Santa Claus

American Christmas songs
Songs about Santa Claus
Songs about mothers
Songs about fathers
Songs about kissing
Number-one singles in the United States
1952 singles
Songs written by Tommie Connor
Jimmy Boyd songs
Christmas novelty songs
Obscenity controversies in music
The Ronettes songs
Song recordings produced by Phil Spector
Song recordings with Wall of Sound arrangements